Coleophora makuensis is a moth of the family Coleophoridae.

References

makuensis
Moths described in 1994